Askellia is a genus of Asian and North American plants in the tribe Cichorieae within the family Asteraceae.

 Species
 Askellia alaica (Krasch.) W.A.Weber - Tajikistan, Kyrgyzstan
 Askellia benthamii (C.B.Clarke) Sennikov - Jammu, Kashmir
 Askellia corniculata (Regel & Schmalh.) W.A.Weber - Tajikistan, Kyrgyzstan, Afghanistan, Pakistan, Jammu, Kashmir
 Askellia elegans (Hook.) W.A.Weber - Canada, United States (Alaska Montana Wyoming)
 Askellia flexuosa (Ledeb.) W.A.Weber - Tuva, Xinjiang, Mongolia, Inner Mongolia, Tibet, Qinghai, Gansu, Shanxi, Kazakhstan, Tajikistan, Kyrgyzstan, Afghanistan, Iran, Pakistan, Jammu, Kashmir, Uttar Pradesh, Himachal Pradesh
 Askellia jacutica (Lomon.) Sennikov - Yakutskiya 
 Askellia karelinii (Popov & Schischk. ex Popov & Schischk.) W.A.Weber - Altay, Kyrgyzstan, Kazakhstan, Tibet, Xinjiang 
 Askellia lactea (Lipsch.) W.A.Weber - Tibet, Tajikistan
 Askellia naniformis (Babc.) Sennikov - Himachal Pradesh, Jammu, Kashmir
 Askellia pseudonaniformis (C.Shih) Sennikov - Xinjiang 
 Askellia pygmaea (Ledeb.) Sennikov - Siberia, Russian Far East, Tibet, Xinjiang, Mongolia, Kazakhstan, Canada, western United States (Alaska Washington Oregon California Nevada Idaho Utah Montana Wyoming)
 Askellia sogdiana (Krasch.) W.A.Weber - Tajikistan, Kyrgyzstan

References 

Cichorieae
Asteraceae genera